The Chief of the General Staff is the head of the General Staff and the highest ranking officer of the Russian Armed Forces or is also the senior-most uniformed military officer. He is appointed by the President of Russia, who is the Supreme Commander-in-Chief. The position dates to the period of the Russian Empire. The current Chief of the General Staff is Army General Valery Gerasimov.

List of chiefs of the general staff

† denotes people who died in office.

Imperial Russian Army (1812–1917)

Director of the Inspection Department of the Ministry of War

Chief of the Main Staff

Chief of the General Directorate of the General Staff

Council of People's Commissars on War and Navy Affairs (1917–1918)

{| width=100% |
| width=50% valign=top |

Revolutionary Military Council of the Republic (1918–1921)

Red Army (1921–1946)

Chief of the Staff

Chief of the General Staff

Soviet Armed Forces (1946–1991)

Russian Armed Forces (1992–present)

Notes

See also
 Commander-in-Chief of the Russian Ground Forces
 Commander-in-Chief of the Russian Aerospace Forces
 Commander-in-Chief of the Russian Navy

References

Further reading
 V.I. Feskov, K.A. Kalashnikov, V.I. Golikov, The Soviet Army in the Years of the Cold War 1945–91, Tomsk University Publishing House, Tomsk, 2004 (for Soviet era list of CGSs).

External links
 Official Russian Ministry of Defense website

Russia
Military of Russia
Military of the Soviet Union